Pepa Airport  is an airstrip  east of the village of Pepa in Tanganyika Province, Democratic Republic of the Congo.

History
In April 2000, during the Second Congo War (1998-2003),
a Rwandan Air Force Antonov An-8 crashed on take-off from the airstrip, killing the crew of four and about 20 Rwandan soldiers, including a Rwanda Army major, two captains, and two lieutenants. Other reports placed the death toll as high as 57.

The cause was thought to be a birdstrike.

See also

Transport in the Democratic Republic of the Congo
List of airports in the Democratic Republic of the Congo

References

External links
 HERE Maps - Pepa
 OpenStreetMap - Pepa
 OurAirports - Pepa
 FallingRain - Pepa

Airports in Tanganyika Province